İsmetpaşa is a village in Mahmudiye District of Eskişehir Province, Turkey. At  it is situated in the high plains of Central Anatolia. The population of İsmetpaşa was 1356. as of 2012.

The village is populated by Kurds.

References

Populated places in Eskişehir Province
Towns in Turkey
Mahmudiye District

Kurdish settlements in East Marmara Region